Coincidence detection in the context of neurobiology is a process by which a neuron or a neural circuit can encode information by detecting the occurrence of temporally close but spatially distributed input signals. Coincidence detectors influence neuronal information processing by reducing temporal jitter, reducing spontaneous activity, and forming associations between separate neural events. This concept has led to a greater understanding of neural processes and the formation of computational maps in the brain.

Principles of coincidence detection

Coincidence detection relies on separate inputs converging on a common target. Consider a basic neural circuit with two input neurons, A and B, that have excitatory synaptic terminals converging on a single output neuron, C (Fig. 1). If each input neuron's EPSP is subthreshold for an action potential at C, then C will not fire unless the two inputs from A and B are temporally close together. Synchronous arrival of these two inputs may push the membrane potential of a target neuron over the threshold required to create an action potential. If the two inputs arrive too far apart, the depolarization of the first input may have time to drop significantly, preventing the membrane potential of the target neuron from reaching the action potential threshold. This example incorporates the principles of spatial and temporal summation. Furthermore, coincidence detection can reduce the jitter formed by spontaneous activity. While random sub-threshold stimulations by neuronal cells may not often fire coincidentally, coincident synaptic inputs derived from a unitary external stimulus will ensure that a target neuron fires as a result of the stimulus.

Distal coincidence detection

The above description applies well to feedforward inputs to neurons, which provide inputs from either sensory nerves or lower-level regions in the brain. About 90% of interneural connections are, however, not feedforward but predictive (or modulatory, or attentional) in nature. These connections receive inputs mainly from nearby cells in the same layer as the receiving cell, and also from distant connections which are fed through Layer 1. The dendrites which receive these inputs are quite distant from the cell body, and therefore they exhibit different electrical and signal-processing behaviour compared with the proximal (or feedforward) dendrites described above.

In a short section (perhaps 40 µm long) of distal dendrite, the reaction to activations coming in on synapses to the dendritic spines acts to raise the overall local potential with each incoming signal. This rising potential acts against a background of decay in the potential back to the resting level. If sufficient signals are received within a short period of time (i.e. before the overall voltage decays to background), the voltage of the segment will rise above a threshold, giving rise to a non-linear dendritic spike, which travels, effectively undiminished, all the way to the cell body, and which causes it to become partially depolarised.

This is perhaps the most important form of dendritic coincidence detection in the brain. The more easily understood proximal activation acts over much longer time periods, and is thus much less sensitive to the time factor in coincidence detection.

Sound localization

Coincidence detection has been shown to be a major factor in sound localization along the azimuth plane in several organisms. In 1948, Lloyd A. Jeffress proposed that some organisms may have a collection of neurons that receive auditory input from each ear. The neural pathways to these neurons are called delay lines. Jeffress claimed that the neurons that the delay lines link act as coincidence detectors by firing maximally when receiving simultaneous inputs from both ears. When a sound is heard, sound waves may reach the ears at different times. This is referred to as the interaural time difference (ITD). Due to differing lengths and a finite conduction speed within the axons of the delay lines, different coincidence detector neurons will fire when sound comes from different positions along the azimuth. Jeffress' model proposes that two signals even from an asynchronous arrival of sound in the cochlea of each ear will converge synchronously on a coincidence detector in the auditory cortex based on the magnitude of the ITD (Fig. 2). Therefore, the ITD should correspond to an anatomical map that can be found within the brain. Masakazu Konishi's study on barn owls shows that this is true. Sensory information from the hair cells of the ears travels to the ipsilateral nucleus magnocellularis. From here, the signals project ipsilaterally and contralaterally to two nucleus laminari. Each nucleus laminaris contains coincidence detectors that receive auditory input from the left and the right ear. Since the ipsilateral axons enter the nucleus laminaris dorsally while the contralateral axons enter ventrally, sounds from various positions along the azimuth correspond directly to stimulation of different depths of the nucleus laminaris. From this information, a neural map of auditory space was formed. The function of the nucleus laminaris parallels that of the medial superior olive in mammals.

Synaptic plasticity and associativity
In 1949, Donald Hebb postulated that synaptic efficiency will increase through repeated and persistent stimulation of a postsynaptic cell by a presynaptic cell. This is often informally summarized as "cells that fire together, wire together". The theory was validated in part by the discovery of long-term potentiation. Studies of LTP on multiple presynaptic cells stimulating a postsynaptic cell uncovered the property of associativity. A weak neuronal stimulation onto a pyramidal neuron may not induce long-term potentiation. However, this same stimulation paired with a simultaneous strong stimulation from another neuron will strengthen both synapses. This process suggests that two neuronal pathways converging on the same cell may both strengthen if stimulated coincidentally.

Molecular mechanism of long-term potentiation
LTP in the hippocampus requires a prolonged depolarization that can expel the Mg2+ block of postsynaptic NMDA receptors. The removal of the Mg2+ block allows the flow of Ca2+ into the cell. A large elevation of calcium levels activate protein kinases that ultimately increase the number of postsynaptic AMPA receptors. This increases the sensitivity of the postsynaptic cell to glutamate. As a result, both synapses strengthen. The prolonged depolarization needed for the expulsion of Mg2+ from NMDA receptors requires a high frequency stimulation. Associativity becomes a factor because this can be achieved through two simultaneous inputs that may not be strong enough to activate LTP by themselves.

Besides the NMDA-receptor based processes, further cellular mechanisms allow of the association between two different input signals converging on the same neuron, in a defined timeframe. Upon a simultaneous increase in the intracellular concentrations of cAMP and Ca2+, a transcriptional coactivator called TORC1 (CRTC1) becomes activated, that converts the temporal coincidence of the two second messengers into long term changes such as LTP. This cellular mechanism, through calcium-dependent adenylate cyclase activation, might also account for the detection of the repetitive stimulation of a given synapse.

Adenylyl cyclase (also commonly known as adenyl cyclase and adenylate cyclase) has been implicated in memory formation as a coincidence detector

Molecular mechanism of long-term depression
Long-term depression also works through associative properties although it is not always the reverse process of LTP. LTD in the cerebellum requires a coincident stimulation of parallel fibers and climbing fibers. Glutamate released from the parallel fibers activates AMPA receptors which depolarize the postsynaptic cell. The parallel fibers also activate metabotropic glutamate receptors that release the second messengers IP3 and DAG. The climbing fibers stimulate a large increase in postsynaptic Ca2+ levels when activated. The Ca2+, IP3, and DAG work together in a signal transduction pathway to internalize AMPA receptors and decrease the sensitivity of the postsynaptic cell to glutamate.

See also

Coincidence circuit
Earth Coincidence Control Office
Hebbian theory
Long-term depression
Long-term potentiation
Neurobiology
Neuroethology
Quantum mind
Sound localization

References

Further reading

https://web.archive.org/web/20040519194818/http://bbsonline.cup.cam.ac.uk/Preprints/OldArchive/bbs.neur4.crepel.html

External links
 Auditory Localization by ITD Analysis: The Jeffress Model - Online interactive tutorial (Flash)

Neuroethology concepts
Coincidence